Princeton Tiger or Tiger Magazine is the second oldest college humor magazine in the United States, published by Princeton University undergraduates since 1882. It is best known for giving the start to literary and artistic talent as wide-ranging as F. Scott Fitzgerald, John McPhee, Jim Lee, Booth Tarkington. and Tim Ferriss, first publishing the "Man from Nantucket" limerick, and being the first published source using the Tiger as mascot for Princeton.

History 
The magazine's style has not remained stagnant over the past 135 years. While the format in the mid-20th century still tended towards humorous, light pieces, the off-campus circulation was broader and the writing reflected it. In recent years, Tiger Magazine has moved to the internet, where it has begun to expand its topics to be more accessible to those outside of Princeton.

Past editorial boards have occasionally published material sufficiently offensive as to spark controversy. Most famous among those controversies was the "Brooke Book" issue of 1983, which satirized an actress named "Brook Shell" who had been purportedly accepted into Princeton—a thinly veiled jab at the real-life actress-model Brooke Shields, shortly after she was accepted into Princeton's class of 1987. While the published material was substantially less obscene than some of the drafts that led to it (see the links below for details), the magazine's graduate board was so disturbed as to fire the top undergraduate officers shortly after the issue was published. The issue became a campus cause célèbre, attracting national news attention.

The March 30, 1893 issue contained the earliest print appearance of the delayed postfixed Not! joke. Tiger Magazine also has the first recorded "There once was a man from Nantucket" limerick.

Alumni 
A number of its writers and editors later went on to notable literary or artistic careers.

 Bill Brown
 Robert Caro
 Whitney Darrow, Jr.
 Chip Deffaa
 Tim Ferriss
 F. Scott Fitzgerald
 Joshua Hammer
 David Itzkoff
 Rob Kutner
 Jim Lee
Aaron Marcus
 Henry Martin
 John McPhee
 Kenneth Offit
 Henry Payne
 John Seabrook
 Bob Smiley
 Booth Tarkington
 Lewis Thomas
 Katrina vanden Heuvel
 Christine Whelan
 Michael Witte

References

External links 
 The Princeton Tiger - Tigermag.com
 Princeton Companion Article about Tiger Magazine
 Princeton Alumni Weekly (PAW) article about the changing state of the magazine
 PAW article discussing Tiger Magazine and Brooke Shields

College humor magazines
Princeton University
Magazines established in 1882
Princeton University publications
Magazines published in New Jersey